Paranormal Activity is a 2007 American supernatural horror film produced, written, directed, photographed and edited by Oren Peli. It centers on a young couple (Katie Featherston and Micah Sloat) who are haunted by a supernatural presence in their home. They then set up a camera to document what is haunting them. The film uses found-footage conventions that were mirrored in the later films of the series.

Originally developed as an independent feature and given film festival screenings in 2007, the film was shot for $15,000. It was then acquired by Paramount Pictures and modified, particularly with a new ending that cost an additional $200,000. It was given a limited U.S. release on September 25, 2009, and then a nationwide release on October 16, 2009. The film earned nearly $108 million at the U.S. box office and a further $85 million internationally for a worldwide total of $194 million. Paramount/DreamWorks acquired the U.S. rights for $350,000. It is often cited as the most profitable film ever made, based on proportionate return on investment, although such figures are difficult to verify independently as this is likely to exclude marketing costs.

The film is the first entry in the Paranormal Activity film series. A parallel sequel, Paranormal Activity 2, was released in 2010. The success of the first two films would spawn additional films in the series: the prequel Paranormal Activity 3 in 2011, and sequel to the second film, Paranormal Activity 4 in 2012. The fifth installment and spin-off, The Marked Ones, was released in 2014, and the sixth installment, The Ghost Dimension, was released in 2015. A video game, The Lost Soul, was released in 2017, while a seventh film, Next of Kin, was released in 2021.

Plot

Katie and Micah move to a new house in San Diego. Katie claims an evil presence has been haunting her since she was a child, so Micah sets up a camera in their bedroom to record any paranormal activity that occurs while they sleep. Katie visits psychic Dr. Fredrichs, who suggests Katie is being haunted by a demon that feeds off of negative energy and is intent on tormenting her. He advises not to communicate with the demon without a demonologist, but Micah continues to film and seek it out.

The camera captures many strange occurrences during the night; they start off as minor noises, flickering lights, and bedroom door movements, but over time escalate into violent door slamming loud thuds, and demonic grunts and screeches. One night, Katie appears to be in a trance; she gets up, stands beside the bed staring at Micah for two hours, and goes outside, none of which she recalls the next day.

Micah brings home a Ouija board. When the couple leaves the house, the camera records an unseen force moving the board's pointer on its surface, which then spontaneously catches fire. Katie is increasingly aggravated by Micah's flippant behavior and pleads to contact the demonologist, but he refuses. The couple finds non-human footsteps on baby powder Micah sprinkled in the hallway; its path leads to a burnt photograph of a young Katie in the attic, thought to have been destroyed in a house fire. Outside intervention is unavailable, as the demonologist is out of the country and Dr. Fredrichs is afraid of making the demon angrier. That night, Katie is pulled out of the bedroom by an unseen force. Micah discovers a bite mark on Katie's back the morning after, motivating him to get out of the house, but Katie abruptly insists on staying.

On night twenty-one, Katie gets out of bed again and stares at Micah for two hours before going downstairs. Katie screams profusely for Micah and he quickly rushes to help her. Afterward, Micah screams in pain with loud thuds. After a moment of silence, Micah's body is violently hurled at the camera which is knocked off the tripod, revealing Katie standing in the doorway with blood on her shirt. She crawls to Micah's body, then looks up at the camera with a grin. As she lunges toward the camera, her face takes on a demonic snarl, and the scene cuts to black. The epilogue text states Micah's body is discovered by the police, and Katie is missing.

Alternate endings
Once Paramount acquired the film, the original ending was shown at only one public viewing before being scrapped; two new endings were developed, one theatrically released above and the other available as an alternate ending on home releases.

Original scrapped ending
Katie returns to the bedroom alone, covered in blood and holding a large kitchen knife. She sits on the floor against the bed and rocks back and forth. The next day, Katie's friend Amber leaves a concerned message at 2 PM, visits the house at 9 PM, discovers Micah's body downstairs, and runs away in panic. Thirty minutes later, two policemen enter the house and reach the bedroom where they find the possessed Katie with the knife. Seeing them, Katie suddenly returns to her normal state and asks about Micah. After the attic door slams by itself, one of the officers panics and shoots and kills her. The camera fades to black as the police officers continue searching the house for the source of the sound. An epilogue text appears dedicating the film to the memory of Micah and Katie.

New alternate ending
After killing Micah off-screen, Katie comes back upstairs alone like in the original ending. She closes and locks the bedroom door, approaches the camera and promptly slits her own throat, before collapsing dead. The scene then fades to black.

Cast
 Katie Featherston as Katie
 Micah Sloat as Micah
 Mark Fredrichs as Dr. Fredrichs
 Amber Armstrong as Amber
 Ashley Palmer as Diane

Production
Attempting to focus on believability rather than action and gore, Peli chose to shoot the picture with a home video camera. In deciding on a more raw and stationary format (the camera was almost always sitting on a tripod or something else) and eliminating the need for a camera crew, a "higher degree of plausibility" was created for the audience as they were "more invested in the story and the characters". Peli says that the dialogue was "natural" because there was no real script. Instead, the actors were given outlines of the story and situations to improvise, a technique known as "retroscripting" also used in the making of The Blair Witch Project. In casting the movie, Peli auditioned "a few hundred people" before finally meeting Katie Featherston and Micah Sloat. He originally auditioned them individually and later called them back to audition together. Peli was impressed with the chemistry between the actors, saying, "If you saw the [audition] footage, you would've thought they had known each other for years." During a guest appearance on The Jay Leno Show on November 3, 2009, Sloat and Featherston explained they each saw the casting call on LACasting. Featherston noted they were originally paid $500 for their work.

The film was shot out of sequence due to Peli's self-imposed seven-day shooting schedule, though he would have preferred the story to have unfolded for the actors as he had envisioned it. Sloat, who controlled the camera for a good deal of the film, was a former cameraman at his university's TV station. "It was a very intense week", Peli said, stating that the film would be shot day and night, edited at the same time, and would have the visual effects applied to it as the acting footage was being finalized. Multiple endings were conceived, but not all of them were shot.

The film was screened at 2007's Screamfest Horror Film Festival, where it impressed an assistant at the Creative Artists Agency, Kirill Baru, so much that CAA signed on to represent Peli. Attempting to find a distributor for the film and/or directing work for Peli, the agency sent out DVDs of the movie to as many people in the industry as they could, and it was eventually seen by Miramax Films Senior Executive Jason Blum, who thought it had potential. He worked with Peli to re-edit the film and submitted it to the Sundance Film Festival, but it was rejected. The DVD also impressed DreamWorks executives Adam Goodman, Stacey Snider, and finally Steven Spielberg, who cut a deal with Blum and Peli.

DreamWorks' plan was to remake the film with a bigger budget and with Peli directing, and only to include the original version as an extra when the DVD was eventually released. "They didn't know what to do with [the original]", said Blum; they just wanted to be "in business" with Peli. Blum and Peli agreed, but stipulated a test screening of the original film before going ahead with the remake, believing it would be well received by a theatrical audience.

During the screening, people began walking out; Goodman thought the film was bombing, until he learned that the viewers were actually leaving because they were so frightened. He then realized a remake was unwise. When the film was taken in by Paramount, several changes were made. Some scenes were cut, others added, and the original ending was scrapped, with two new endings being shot. The ending shown in theaters during the film's worldwide release is the only one of the three to feature visual effects, and it differs from the endings previously seen at the Screamfest and Burbank screenings. The theatrical release was delayed indefinitely because Paramount had put all DreamWorks productions on hold. Meanwhile, a screening for international buyers resulted in the sale of international rights in 52 countries. Only after Goodman became production chief at Paramount in June 2009 did the film finally get slated for a fall release.

Release
Paranormal Activity premiered at Screamfest Horror Film Festival in North America on October 14, 2007, was shown at the Slamdance Film Festival on January 18, 2008, and screened at the 36th Annual Telluride Film Festival on September 6, 2009.

The version with the new ending, made after Paramount acquired the film, had screenings on September 25, 2009, in twelve college towns across the United States. The venues included Ann Arbor, MI; Baton Rouge, LA; Boulder, CO; Columbus, OH; Durham, NC; Lincoln, NE; Madison, WI; Orlando, FL; Santa Cruz, CA; Seattle, WA; State College, PA; and Tucson, AZ. Eleven of the twelve venues sold out with State College, PA being the only exception due to a Penn State football game that was held the same night. On his website, director Oren Peli invited internet users to "demand" where the film went next by voting on Eventful. This was the first time a major motion picture studio used the service to virally market a film. On September 28, Paramount issued a press release on Peli's website, announcing openings in 20 other markets on October 2, including larger market cities such as New York and Chicago.

On October 3, it was reported that a total of 33 screenings in all 20 markets had sold out and that the film had earned $500,000 domestically. A day later, Paramount announced that the film would have a full limited release in 40 markets, playing at all hours (including after-midnight showings). On October 6, Paramount announced that the movie would be released nationwide if the film received one million "demands" on Eventful. The full limited release of the film started on October 9. On October 10, the Eventful.com counter hit over one million requests. Paramount announced soon after that the film would get a wide domestic release on October 16 and expand to more theaters on October 23. By November, it was showing in theaters worldwide.

Home media
Paranormal Activity was not released on DVD or Blu-ray until December 29, 2009, more than two years after the film was made. The home release includes one alternate ending to the theatrical version. It was released in the United Kingdom on March 22, 2010, on DVD and Blu-ray with some specials. In the Netherlands the movie received a release on VHS in 2010.

Additionally, at the end of the film, 15 minutes worth of names were added to the DVD release, as part of a special promotion. The message that popped up before this said: "The fans who "demanded" the film were asked by email if they wanted to have their name appear as a thank you for the film's success."

Reception

Box office
The film opened on September 25, 2009, to twelve theaters and took $36,146 on its opening day and $77,873 on its first weekend for an average of $6,489 per venue. It had more success when it opened to 33 theaters on October 1, 2009, doubling the box-office reception, grossing $532,242 for an average of $16,129 per venue, bringing the 10-day total to $776,763.

As it expanded to 160 theaters on the October 9–11 weekend, the film grossed $2.7 million on that Friday, having a per-theater average of $16,621. It went on to gross $7.9 million. Over the weekend, the film reached the week's highest per-theater average of $49,379, coming in at fourth for the weekend, behind Couples Retreat, Zombieland, and Cloudy with a Chance of Meatballs. Over the weekend of October 16, 2009, Paranormal Activity expanded to 600 more theaters, grossing $19.6 million with $25,813 per theater average gross, and bringing the total gross to $33.2 million. On the weekend of October 23, 2009, Paranormal Activity rose to first, beating out Saw VI, earning $21,104,070, expanding to 1,945 theaters for an average of $10,850 per theater, compared with the $14.1 million gross from 3,036 theaters, and $4,650 average for Saw VI. The film has grossed $107.9 million domestically and $85.4 million in foreign markets, with a total gross of $194.2 million. The Hollywood Reporter estimated the film made a net profit of $78 million.

Critical response
On review aggregator Rotten Tomatoes, the film has an overall approval rating of 83% based on 205 reviews, with an average rating of 7.00/10. The website's critical consensus reads, "Using its low-budget effects and mockumentary method to great result, Paranormal Activity turns a simple haunted house story into 90 minutes of relentless suspense." On Metacritic, the film has a weighted average score of 68 out of 100 based on 24 critics, indicating "generally favorable reviews".

Film critics James Berardinelli and Roger Ebert each awarded it 3.5 stars out of a maximum of 4 stars. Ebert stated in his review, "It illustrates one of my favorite points, that silence and waiting can be more entertaining than frantic fast-cutting and berserk f/x. For extended periods here, nothing at all is happening, and believe me, you won't be bored." Entertainment Weekly critic Owen Gleiberman gave Paranormal Activity an A− rating and called it "frightening...freaky and terrifying" and said that "Paranormal Activity scrapes away 30 years of encrusted nightmare clichés." Bloody Disgusting ranked the film 16th in their list of the "Top 20 Horror Films of the Decade", with the article saying, "Peli deserves props for milking the maximum amount of tension out of the spare, modern setting—an ordinary, cookie-cutter tract home in San Diego. It doesn't sound very scary, but Peli manages to make it terrifying. If you aren't white-knuckling your armrest at least once or twice while watching it, you probably don't have a pulse."

However, some critics disliked the film. Michael Carter of The Breeze summed up the film as "all right", though denouncing its reliance on "cheap jump scares and an even cheaper 'found footage' style". David Stratton of the Australian television series At the Movies said that "it was extremely unthrilling, very obvious, very clichéd. We've seen it all before." Marc Savlov of The Austin Chronicle called it "an excruciatingly tedious YouTube gag cleverly marketed to go viral". Bill Gibron of PopMatters listed the film as the second worst horror film of all time, writing that it lacked "anything remotely redeeming for the seasoned fright fan", and was "a waste of time in both concept and execution".

Accolades
The film was nominated for Best First Feature in the Independent Spirit Awards 2009.

Legacy
The monetary success of Paranormal Activity compared to its budget made it the most profitable film of all time, surpassing The Blair Witch Project (1999). It directly led to found footage becoming a horror movie trend for years, with The Last Exorcism, Apollo 18, The Devil Inside, and the V/H/S series arriving in its wake.

Mockbuster group The Asylum created their take on the film, titled Paranormal Entity, which would later spawn a series of its own. In Japan, a sequel entitled Paranormal Activity 2: Tokyo Night was released in 2010.

On March 7, 2010, Alec Baldwin and Steve Martin performed a spoof of the film as part of the 82nd Academy Awards. A Haunted House, a parody film, was released in 2013.

Digital comics
In December 2009, a short digital comic entitled Paranormal Activity: The Search for Katie was released for the iPhone. It was written by Scott Lobdell and features art from Mark Badger.

Video game
A video game called Paranormal Activity: The Lost Soul was released by VRWerx for the Oculus Rift, HTC Vive and PlayStation 4. The PlayStation 4 version can be played in both PlayStation VR and regular mode.

Sequels

A parallel sequel and prequel, Paranormal Activity 2, was released in 2010. The success of the first two films would spawn additional films in the series: the prequel Paranormal Activity 3 in 2011, and Paranormal Activity 4 (the sequel to the second installment) in 2012. The fifth installment and spin-off, The Marked Ones, was released in 2014, and the sixth installment, The Ghost Dimension, was released in 2015. A seventh mainline installment, titled Next of Kin, was released on October 29, 2021 to the Paramount+ streaming service, with an eighth installment, The Other Side, set for a 2023 release.

See also
 List of media set in San Diego

References

External links

  (Archived)
 
 
 
 

 
2007 films
2007 horror films
2000s horror thriller films
2007 independent films
2000s psychological horror films
2007 psychological thriller films
2000s supernatural films
American haunted house films
American horror thriller films
American independent films
American psychological horror films
American psychological thriller films
American supernatural horror films
Films about couples
Camcorder films
Demons in film
Films about sleep disorders
Films about spirit possession
Blumhouse Productions films
Icon Productions films
Paramount Pictures films
Films produced by Jason Blum
Films set in 2006
Films set in San Diego
Films shot in San Diego
2000s supernatural horror films
2007 directorial debut films
2000s English-language films
2000s American films
Found footage films